Abu Ubaidah al-Masri (died December 2007) was an al-Qaeda operative in Pakistan. Al-Masri was implicated in the 2006 Transatlantic Aircraft Plot, which was to be carried out by a terrorist cell operating in London, but which was orchestrated by al-Qaeda's central leadership.

Biography
Al-Masri was Egyptian (the epithet literally means 'the Egyptian') but he received combat experience, and terrorist and insurgent training in Afghanistan, Bosnia and Chechnya.

Al-Masri was thought to be a provincial al-Qaeda commander in Afghanistan, but according to The New York Times, "[al-Masri] emerged as one of Al Qaeda's senior operatives after the death of Abu Hamza Rabia, another Egyptian who was killed by a missile strike in Pakistan in 2005."

Al-Masri lived in Germany before going to Afghanistan to join the Mujahadeen. After Afghanistan, he returned to Germany to begin building a network in Europe.

In 2006, two attempts were made by coalition forces to kill him.

Death
According to U.S. government counterterrorism sources, al-Masri is believed to have died in December 2007, in Pakistan's tribal region, probably due to hepatitis. Al-Masri was between 40 and 50 years old.

References

 "A look inside Al Qaeda" by Sebastian Rotella, April 2, 2008, The Los Angeles Times, retrieved April 9, 2008

Al-Qaeda leaders
Egyptian al-Qaeda members
Year of birth missing
2007 deaths
Deaths from hepatitis
Egyptian expatriates in Pakistan